Barrier is a Polish drama film directed by Jerzy Skolimowski, released in 1966. The hero quits his studies, resolving to seek social advancement by any means. A new girlfriend changes his mind.

Details 
 Title : Barrier
 Original title: Bariera
 Director: Jerzy Skolimowski
 Writer: Jerzy Skolimowski
 Country of origin: Poland
 Format : Black and white- Mono – 35 mm
 Genre : Drama
 Length: 77 minutes
 Release date: 1966

Cast 
 Joanna Szczerbic : Tram conductor
 Jan Nowicki : Protagonist
 Tadeusz Łomnicki : Doctor
 Maria Malicka : Businesswoman
 Zdzisław Maklakiewicz : Paper seller
 Ryszard Pietruski : Oberwaiter
 Bogdan Baer : Man at bar
 Henryk Bąk : Doctor
 Stefan Friedmann : Tram conductor asking for help
 Andrzej Herder : Manius
 Malgorzata Lorentowicz : Owner of the apartment
 Zygmunt Malanowicz : Eddy
Janusz Gajos : Streetcar
Marian Kociniak : Streetcar

External links

References

1966 films
Polish black-and-white films
1966 drama films
Films directed by Jerzy Skolimowski
Films directed by Henning Carlsen
Films scored by Krzysztof Komeda
Films with screenplays by Jerzy Skolimowski
Polish drama films
1960s Polish-language films